Seán Keenan (died 3 March 1993) was an Irish republican from Derry, Northern Ireland.

Keenan was interned without trial on three occasions: 1940–1945, 1957–1961, and 9 August 1971 – 27 April 1972. He spent a total of 15 years in jail despite never being convicted of an offence. In March 1972, a month before his final release, he was paroled for the funeral of his son Colm, a Provisional Irish Republican Army officer who had been shot by the British Army.

Keenan was chairman of the Derry Citizens Defence Association between July and October 1969, and played a prominent role in the events surrounding the creation and defence of Free Derry. In the late 1980s, he was made honorary vice president for life of Republican Sinn Féin until his death.

He is commemorated annually by Republican Sinn Féin in the month of March at the Seán Keenan Memorial (Celtic Cross) on Fahan Street in the Bogside area of Derry City.

His son, also named Sean, was a Sinn Féin councillor. He died after a long battle with cancer in August 2006.

See also
 HMS Al Rawdah (1911)
 HMS Maidstone (1937)
 Maze (HM Prison)
 Operation Demetrius

References

External links

Internment, John McGuffin (1973) Chapter 8 - INTERNMENT 1971: THOSE DETAINED

1993 deaths
Irish Republican Army (1922–1969) members
Irish republicans
Irish republicans interned without trial
Republican Sinn Féin members
Year of birth missing